The Warrego Valles are a set of channels in an ancient river valley in the Thaumasia quadrangle of Mars, located at 42.2° south latitude and 93° west longitude. They are 188 km long and were named after a modern Australian River.

Mariner 9 and Viking Orbiter images showed a network of branching valleys in Thaumasia called the Warrego Valles. These networks are evidence that Mars may have once been warmer, wetter, and perhaps had precipitation in the form of rain or snow.  At first glance they resemble river valleys on Earth.  But sharper images from more advanced cameras reveal that the valleys are not continuous.    They are very old and may have been eroded.  A picture below shows some of these branching valleys.  A study with the Mars Orbiter Laser Altimeter, Thermal Emission Imaging System (THEMIS) and the Mars Orbiter Camera (MOC) support the idea that the Warrego Valles were formed from precipitation.

References

See also

 Climate on Mars
 Geology of Mars
 Lunae Palus quadrangle
 Outflow channels
 Valley network (Mars)
 Vallis (planetary geology)
 Water on Mars

Thaumasia quadrangle
Valleys and canyons on Mars